Car finance refers to the various financial products which allow someone to acquire a car, including car loans and leases.

Car purchases 
The most common method of buying a car in the United States is borrowing the money and then paying it off in installments. Over 85% of new cars and half of used cars are financed (as opposed to being paid for in a lump sum with cash). Roughly 30% of new vehicles during the same time period were leased.

There are two primary methods of borrowing money to buy a car: direct and indirect. A direct loan is one that the borrower arranges with a lender directly. Indirect financing is arranged by the car dealership where the car is purchased. Legally, an indirect “loan” is not technically a loan; when a car buyer obtains financing facilitated by a dealership, the buyer and dealer sign a Retail Installment Sales Contract rather than a loan agreement. The dealer then typically sells or assigns that contract to a bank, credit union, or other financial institution. Usually, the dealer knows in advance which financial institution will buy the contract. The borrower then pays off the financial institution the same as for a direct loan. Typically, the indirect auto lender will set an interest rate, known as the "buy rate". The auto dealer then adds a markup to that rate, and presents the result to the customer as the "contract rate". These markups have been the focus of some regulatory scrutiny because they can cause variations in interest rates that are not correlated with credit risk.

Roughly half of new cars in the U.S. are financed by the captive financing arms of car manufacturers, such as the Ford Motor Credit Company. Captives have a smaller share of the overall car financing market (new and used cars), along with banks, credit unions, and finance companies. A small number of cars are financed directly by the dealership at "Buy Here Pay Here" dealers, which cater to customers with subprime credit. Buy Here Pay Here financing accounts for 6% of the total financing market.

Car financing options in the United Kingdom similarly include car loans, hire purchase, personal contract hires (car leasing) and Personal Contract Purchases.

In 2016, Toyota was found guilty of racist lending practices.

Car leases 
A lease is a contractual agreement between a lessor (the person who owns the property) and a lessee (the person who gets to use it during the term of the lease). Usually, car leases allow the lessee to drive the car for a certain number of miles (under 12,000 per year is standard) for a certain number of years (say, three years). The lessee pays a fixed monthly payment for the privilege of driving the vehicle, and when the lease ends, the lessee returns the vehicle to the lessor. Lease rates are not just based on what the car is worth today because the lessee does not buy the whole car. Instead, the lessee pays only for the value of the vehicle for the term of the lease. Lenders calculate lease payments based on the vehicle’s residual value, or what they estimate the car will be worth when the lease is over.

Spot delivery 

Spot delivery (or spot financing) is a term used in the automobile industry that means delivery a vehicle to a buyer prior to financing on the vehicle being completed. Spot delivery is used by dealerships on the weekend or after bank hours to be able to deliver a vehicle when a final approval cannot be received from a bank. This method of delivery is regulated by many states in the U.S., and is sometimes referred to as a "Yo-Yo sale" or "Yo-Yo Financing".

See also
 Automobile costs

References

External links 
 Auto Finance: Market Trends from the Financial Consumer Agency of Canada

Automotive industry
Car costs